This article gives a list of the High Priests (Kohen Gadol) of Ancient Israel up to the destruction of the Second Temple in 70 AD. Because of a lack of historical data, this list is incomplete and there may be gaps.

High Priests of Israel

The High Priests, like all Levitical priests, belonged to the Aaronic line. The Bible mentions the majority of high priests before the Babylonian captivity, but does not give a complete list of office holders. Lists would be based on various historical sources. In several periods of gentile rule, high priests were appointed and removed by kings. Still, most high priests came from the Aaronic line. One exception is Menelaus, who may not have been from the Tribe of Levi at all, but from the Tribe of Benjamin.

From the Exodus to Solomon's Temple

The following section is based on information found in the various books of the Bible, including the genealogies given in First Book of Chronicles and the Book of Ezra, the works of Josephus and the early-medieval Seder Olam Zutta.

 Aaron
 Eleazar, son of Aaron
 Phinehas, son of Eleazar
 Abishua, son of Phinehas
 The Samaritans insert Shesha as the son of Abishua and father of Bukki.
 Bukki, son of Abishua
 Uzzi, son of Bukki

At some time, the office was transferred from descendants of Eleazar to those of his brother Itamar. The first known and most notable high priest of Itamar's line was Eli, a contemporary of Samuel.

 Eli, descendant of Ithamar, son of Aaron 
 Ahitub, son of Phinehas and grandson of  Eli
 Ahijah, son of Ahitub
 Ahimelech, son of Ahijah (or brother of Ahijah and son of Ahitub)
 Abiathar, son of Ahimelech

Abiathar was removed from the high priesthood for conspiring against King Solomon, and was replaced by Zadok, son of Ahitub, who oversaw the construction of the First Temple.

First Temple period
From Solomon's time until the Babylonian captivity the High Priests officiated at Solomon's Temple in Jerusalem.
Information about who served in that office diverges between the Bible, Josephus and the Seder Olam Zutta. While Josephus and Seder 'Olam Zuta each mention 18 high priests, the genealogy given in  gives twelve names, culminating in the last high priest Seriah, father of Jehozadak. However, it is unclear whether all those mentioned in the genealogy between Zadok and Jehozadak were high priests and whether high priests mentioned elsewhere (such as Jehoiada and Jehoiarib) are simply omitted or did not belong to the male line in this genealogy. 

Some name Jehozadak, son of Seriah, as a high priest prior to being sent to captivity in Babylonia, based on the biblical references to "Joshua, son of Jehozadak, the high priest". According to Rashi (Rabbi Shlomo Yitzhaqi), this is a misreading of the phrase, as "the high priest" does not refer to Jehozadak, who was exiled to Babylon without having served as high priest, but to his son Joshua, who ascended from Babylon at the end of the exile.

After the Babylonian captivity

Dates and contemporaries are taken from James C. VanderKam's From Joshua to Caiaphas: High Priests After the Exile.
 Joshua, son of Jehozadak,  after the building of the Second Temple. Contemporary of Cyrus the Great (reigned 538-530 BC) and Darius I (reigned 522-486 BC).
 Joiakim, son of Joshua (Nehemiah 12:10). 
 Eliashib, son of Joiakim (Nehemiah 12:10). Mentioned in the time of Nehemiah in 444 BC.
 Joiada, son of Eliashib (Nehemiah 12:10).(A son married a daughter of Sanballat the Horonite for which he was driven out of the Temple by Nehemiah) (Nehemiah 13:28)
 Johanan, son of Joiada (Nehemiah 12:11). Mentioned in the Elephantine papyri in 410 BC.
 Jaddua, son of Johanan (Nehemiah 12:11). Contemporary of Alexander the Great (reigned 336-323 BC). Some have identified him as Simeon the Just.

The five descendants of Joshua are mentioned in Nehemiah, chapter 12, 10f. The chronology given above, based on Josephus, however is not undisputed, with some alternatively placing Jaddua during the time of Darius II (423-405/4 BC) and some supposing one more Johanan and one more Jaddua in the following time, the latter Jaddua being contemporary of Alexander the Great.

 Onias I, son of Jaddua. Contemporary of Areus I of Sparta (reigned 309-265 BC).
 Simon I, son of Onias. Josephus identified him as Simeon the Just
 Eleazar, son of Onias and brother of Simon I. Contemporary of Ptolemy II Philadelphus of Egypt (reigned 283-246 BC).
 Manasseh, son of Jaddua, brother of Onias I and uncle of Simon I and Eleazar.
 Onias II, son of Simon I. Contemporary of Ptolemy III Euergetes of Egypt (reigned 246-221 BC).
 Simon II, son of Onias II. Contemporary of Ptolemy IV Philopator of Egypt (221-204 BC).
 Onias III, son of Simon II (?-175 BC), murdered 170 BC.
 Onias IV, son of Onias III, fled to Egypt and built a Jewish Temple at Leontopolis (closed between 66-73 AD).
 Jason, son of Simon II, 175-172 BC (the last of the Zadokite dynasty).
 Menelaus, 172-165 BC
 Judas Maccabeus, son of Mattathias, 165-162 BC (held the office after the consecration of the Temple)
 Alcimus, 162-159 BC

Inter-sacerdotium
It is unknown who held the position of High Priest of Jerusalem between Alcimus' death and the accession of Jonathan Apphus. Josephus, in Jewish Antiquities XX.10, relates that the office was vacant for seven years, but this is highly unlikely, if not impossible. In religious terms, the High Priest was a necessary part of the rites on the Day of Atonement, a day that could have not been allowed to pass uncelebrated for so long so soon after the restoration of the Temple service. Politically, Israel's overlords probably would not have allowed a power vacuum to last that length of time.

In another passage (XII.10 §6, XII.11 §2) Josephus suggests that Judas Maccabeus, the brother of Jonathan, held the office for three years, succeeding Alcimus. However, Judas actually predeceased Alcimus by one year. The nature of Jonathan's accession to the high priesthood makes it unlikely that Judas held that office during the inter-sacerdotium. The Jewish Encyclopedia tries to harmonise the contradictions found in Josephus by supposing that Judas held the office "immediately after the consecration of the Temple (165-162), that is, before the election of Alcimus"

 It has been argued that the founder of the Qumran community, the Teacher of Righteousness (?159-153 BC). was High Priest (but not necessarily the sole occupant) during the inter-sacerdotium and was driven off by Jonathan.

Hasmonean dynasty
 Jonathan Apphus, 153-143 BC
 Simon Thassi, brother of Jonathan Apphus, 142-134 BC
 John Hyrcanus I, son of Simeon Tassi, 134-104 BC
 Aristobulus I, son of John Hyrcanus, 104-103 BC
 Alexander Jannaeus, son of John Hyrcanus, 103-76 BC
 John Hyrcanus II, son of Alexander Jannaeus, 76-66 BC
 Aristobulus II, son of Alexander Jannaeus, 66-63 BC
 Hyrcanus II (restored), 63-40 BC
 Antigonus, son of Aristobulus II, 40-37 BC

Herodian-Roman period
 Ananelus, 37-36 BC
 Aristobulus III, grandson of Aristobulus II and Hyrcanus II, 36 BCHe was the last of the Hasmoneans; brother of Herod's second wife Mariamne I.
 Ananelus (restored), 36-30 BC
 Joshua ben Fabus, 30-23 BC
 Simon ben Boethus, 23-5 BC (his daughter Mariamne II was the third wife of Herod the Great)
 Matthias ben Theophilus, 5-4 BC
 Joazar ben Boethus, 4 BC
 Eleazar ben Boethus, 4-3 BC
 Joshua ben Sie, 3 BC - ? 
 Joazar ben Boethus (restored), ? - 6 AD
 Ananus ben Seth, 6-15
 Ishmael ben Fabus (Phiabi), 15-16
 Eleazar ben Ananus, 16-17
 Simon ben Camithus, 17-18
 Joseph ben Caiaphas, 18-36 (son-in-law of the high priest Ananus ben Seth)
 Jonathan ben Ananus, 36-37
 Theophilus ben Ananus, 37-41
 Simon Cantatheras ben Boethus, 41-43
 Matthias ben Ananus, 43
 Elioneus ben Simon Cantatheras, 43-44  
 Jonathan ben Ananus, 44 (restored)
 Josephus ben Camydus, 44-46
 Ananias son of Nedebeus, 46-58
 Jonathan, 58
 Ishmael II ben Fabus, 58-62 (relation to priest of same name from 15-16 CE?)
 Joseph Cabi ben Simon, 62-63
 Ananus ben Ananus, 63
 Jesus son of Damneus, 63
 Joshua ben Gamla, 63-64 (his wife Martha belonged to family of Boethus)
 Mattathias ben Theophilus, 65-66
 Phannias ben Samuel, 67-70

See also
 Josephus' chain of high priests (from the Second Temple)
 Samaritan High Priest

References

External links
 Article in the Jewish Encyclopedia
  Seder Olam Zutta chronology 
  Seder Olam Zutta chronology

 
Israel religion-related lists
Lists of Jewish religious leaders
High Priests
High Priests
Priesthood (Judaism)